Field theory may refer to:

Science
 Field (mathematics), the theory of the algebraic concept of field
 Field theory (physics), a physical theory which employs fields in the physical sense, consisting of three types:
 Classical field theory, the theory and dynamics of classical fields
 Quantum field theory, the theory of quantum mechanical fields
 Statistical field theory, the theory of critical phase transitions
Grand unified theory

Social science
 Field theory (psychology), a psychological theory which examines patterns of interaction between the individual and his or her environment
 Field theory (sociology), a sociological theory concerning the relationship between social actors and local social orders